The lancer dragonet (Callionymus bairdi), Baird's dragonet, coral dragonet or St Helena dragonet, is a species of dragonet native to the warmer waters of the Atlantic Ocean where it occurs at depths of from .  In the western Atlantic it occurs from Cape Hatteras southwards along the east coast of North America. including Bermuda and the Bahamas, into the Gulf of Mexico  and throughout the Caribbean Sea. It has also been recorded from Ilha da Trindade off Brazil. In the eastern Atlantic it has been recorded from the Cape Verde Islands, Ascension Island, St. Helena, and Sao Tome e Principe in the Gulf of Guinea.  This species grows to a length of  TL.

Callionymus bairdi is found over sandy bottoms but also over substrates of rocky-rubble. It occurs in shallow reefs as well as in beds of Thalassia testudinum. It is a  sexually dimorphic species. The juveniles occur shallower than 15m.

The specific name honours the U.S. ornithologist and ichthyologist Spencer Fullerton Baird (1823-1887).

References

External links
 

lancer dragonet
Fish of the Western Atlantic
Fauna of Saint Helena
lancer dragonet
Taxa named by David Starr Jordan